Samuel Ellis Cook (September 30, 1860 – February 22, 1946) was an American lawyer, jurist, and politician who served one term as a U.S. Representative from Indiana from 1923 to 1925.

Biography
Born on a farm in Huntington County, Indiana, Cook attended the common schools in Whitley County and the normal schools at Columbia City, Indiana, and Ada, Ohio.
He taught school and engaged in agricultural pursuits.
He studied law.
He was graduated from the law department of Valparaiso University, Indiana, in 1888.
He was admitted to the bar the same year and commenced practice in Huntington, Indiana.

He served as prosecuting attorney for Huntington County 1892-1894.
He served as delegate to the Democratic National Convention in 1896.
Editorial writer for the Huntington News-Democrat 1896-1900.
He served as judge of the Huntington circuit court for the fifty-sixth judicial district 1906-1918.

Congress 
Cook was elected as a Democrat to the Sixty-eighth Congress (March 4, 1923 – March 3, 1925).
He was an unsuccessful candidate for reelection in 1924 to the Sixty-ninth Congress.

Later career and death 
He resumed the practice of law in Huntington, Indiana, where he died February 22, 1946.
He was interred in Mount Hope Cemetery.

References

 
 
 

1860 births
1946 deaths
Valparaiso University alumni
People from Huntington County, Indiana
Democratic Party members of the United States House of Representatives from Indiana
People from Huntington, Indiana